Bucranium (plural bucrania; Latin, from Greek βουκράνιον, referring to the skull of an ox) was a form of carved decoration commonly used in Classical architecture. The name is generally considered to originate with the practice of displaying garlanded, sacrificial oxen, whose heads were displayed on the walls of temples, a practice dating back to the sophisticated Neolithic site of Çatalhöyük in eastern Anatolia, where cattle skulls were overlaid with white plaster.

Etymology and sphere of application
The word "bucranium" (latin bucranium) comes from Ancient Greek: βουκράνιον – being composed of βοῦς (ox) and κρανίον (skull) – and literally means "ox skull". Analogic, the Greek word αἰγικράνιον (latin aegicranium) means a "goat skull", also used as a decorative element in architecture.

The technical term "bucranium" was originally used in the description of classical architecture. Its application to the field of prehistoric archeology is relatively recent and is mainly due to the work of the British archaeologist James Mellaart dedicated to the Neolithic site of Çatalhöyük. In 1977, Glyn Daniel established this new meaning of the term, introducing it into the Illustrated Encyclopedia of Archeology.

Overview
In ancient Rome, bucrania were frequently used as metopes between the triglyphs on the friezes of temples designed with the Doric order of architecture. They were also used in bas-relief or painted decor to adorn marble altars, often draped or decorated with garlands of fruit or flowers, many of which have survived.

A rich and festive Doric order was employed at the Basilica Aemilia on the Roman Forum; enough of it was standing for Giuliano da Sangallo to make a drawing, c 1520, reconstructing the facade (Codex Vaticano Barberiniano Latino 4424); the alternation of the shallow libation dishes called paterae with bucrania in the metopes reinforced the solemn sacrificial theme. 

While the presence of bucrania was typically used with the Doric order, the Romans were not strict about this. In a first-century fresco from Boscoreale, protected by the eruption of Mount Vesuvius and now at the Metropolitan Museum of Art, bucrania and cistae mysticae hang on ribbons from pegs that support garlands, evoking joyous fasti. At the Temple of Vesta, Tivoli, designed using the Corinthian order, motifs interpreted by the architect Andrea Palladio as conventional skull bucrania adorn the frieze, although these are actually fleshed ox heads with eyes. Similarly, the Temple of Portunus in Rome, designed using the Ionic order, has bucrania in its frieze. 

In later years, the motif was used to embellish buildings of the Renaissance, Baroque, and Neoclassical periods. Garlanded bucrania provide a repetitive motif in the plasterwork of the fine 18th-century Staircase Hall of The Vyne (Hampshire), inside the Pantheon at Stourhead (Wiltshire) and at Lacock Abbey (Wiltshire).

Gallery

See also
 Oscilla

Notes

References
 Francis Brenders, "The Basilica Aemilia on the Forum Romanum at Rome
 Garlanded bucrania on the Ara Pacis
 Sir William Chambers, A Treatise on the Decorative Part of Civil Architecture, 1791 : Doric order with bucrania between triglyphs
 Garlanded bucrania on the Tomb of Cecelia Metella
 Sylloge Nummorum Gracorum: Rubi: obols with garlanded bucrania on reverse

Further reading
 George Hersey (1988). The Lost Meaning of Classical Architecture: Speculations on Ornament from Vitruvius to Venturi. Cambridge, Mass.: MIT Press. Chapter 2: "Architecture and Sacrifice".

External links 
 

Cattle in art
Ornaments (architecture)
Columns and entablature
Reliefs